Sparx is a fictional superheroine published by DC Comics. She first appeared in The Adventures of Superman Annual #5 (1993) and was created by Karl Kesel, Tom Grummett and Ed Hannigan.

Fictional character biography
Donna Carol Force, or D.C. for short, is part of the meta-human superhero team of Canada, known as the "Force Family". D.C.'s fondest wish has always been to become a meta-human as the rest of her family. In an attempt to trigger her meta-human genes, D.C. went to Metropolis with her uncle Harry hoping to find the alien parasites, that were rampaging the city at the time. It was her belief that the aliens could trigger her meta-genes. The aliens had been doing so, but only as an unintended consequence among the many people they have actually murdered.

D.C. and Harry find the parasite known as Gemir but D.C. changes her mind. This does not help, as she is attacked and bitten, her spinal fluid drained. She turns out to be one of the rare survivors and blasts off in a surge of electrical energy as two paramedics administer first aid.

She assists the hero known as Superboy in a battle in one of the parasite's many hideouts. The two are able to drive the aliens away. D.C. leaves Superboy with a kiss and with the new codename of "Sparx". She encounters her uncle again and tells him she wishes to stay to help destroy the threat of the parasites.

Due to the influence of her bite, Sparx is drawn to the final battle site against the aliens, deep in an American swamp. She finds several other parasite-heroes, 'New Bloods', who had been drawn here too. They join forces with veteran superheroes and destroy all the aliens.

Blood Pack
Some time later, Sparx auditions for the Blood Pack, a team of New Bloods that would star in the "Blood Pack" television show, and she makes the cut. The other cast members include New Bloods known as Loria, Ballistic, Mongrel, Geist, Nightblade, and Razorsharp. They are led and trained by the heroine Jade, the daughter of Alan Scott, the Golden Age Green Lantern. The Bloods find out that the producers of the show are actually members of a secret criminal organisation with a hidden agenda to take over world. The Blood Pack successfully defeat this plan. Despite Jade's continuing efforts, the team drifts apart.

Superboy and the Ravers
Sparx then makes her way to the "Event Horizon", an out-of-the-way realm sometimes referred to as a 'rave', a constant, continuing party. Sparx introduces her old ally Superboy to the situation; this leads to the comic book series Superboy and the Ravers.

As part of the group, Sparx deals with, among other things, alien kidnappers, the behind-the-scenes influences of the Event Horizon management and a villain-filled road trip across the United States. The Rave clique also helps out against the cosmic threats detailed in the Genesis four-part limited series. They are seen fighting the forces of Apokolips.

It is soon noted that Sparx seems more comfortable in her Sparx persona than as D.C. Force. She develops romantic feelings for Superboy, then later, the hero known as Hero. She is rocked when she finds out that Hero is gay.

In an effort against Kindred Grim, Sparx is granted the additional powers of the "Qwa-Angel", a power once belonging to the evil energy powered angels who once lived on Qward. The intent to destroy the Predators, a race of emotion-influencing beings. She is successful, but as a result has lost all of her powers. She never got over the concept of Hero's homosexuality, and she is not in the best of moods since she once again is the only non-powered member of the Force family in Canada.

Assisting others
Despite the loss of power, she appears in Metropolis in Superman/Batman #32 (2007), powered up, under the mental control of an alien armada being influenced by Despero. Many other alien-influenced, currently brainwashed, heroes are seen with her, including several New Bloods, such as Loose Cannon. The gathered heroes try to kill Superman and Batman. Despero is soon defeated and the aliens are convinced to forgo their mental influence.

Sparx is one of the dozens of heroes to help in a Titans-led assist to the bombed city of Bludhaven. This is part of an Infinite Crisis tie-in. 

Donna later appears in Final Crisis along with the twins called Mas Y Menos and Empress in a failed attempt to launch The League of Titans. They are defeated by Mirror Master and the evil Doctor Light. Mas Y Menos are impaled with shards of glass but survive their injuries.

Sparx is listed among the potential candidates for Titans membership in Teen Titans #66, indicating she survived the events of Final Crisis.

References

External links
DCU Guide: Sparx
DCU Guide: Sparx chronology

Comics characters introduced in 1995
Fictional characters with electric or magnetic abilities
DC Comics female superheroes
DC Comics metahumans
DC Comics superheroes
Fictional Canadian people
Characters created by Karl Kesel